Il Sangue verde is an Italian 2010 documentary film.

Synopsis 
January 2010, Rosarno, Calabria. Widely publicized immigrant riots exposed the unjust and squalid conditions that thousands of African laborers, exploited by an economy controlled by the Calabrian mafia, endure on a daily basis. For a brief moment, the immigrants caught the attention of the Italian public, who responded to these protests with fear and violence. In a few hours, the immigrants in question were "evacuated" from Rosarno and the problem was "resolved." But the faces and the stories of those involved in the riots at Rosarno tell a different story.

See also 
 Movies about immigration to Italy

External links

2010 films
Italian documentary films
2010 documentary films
Films about immigration
2010s Italian films